Andy Lee may refer to:


Sportspeople
 Andy Lee (American football) (born 1982), American football punter
 Andy Lee (boxer) (born 1984), Irish boxer
 Andy Lee (footballer, born 1982), English footballer for Bradford City
 Andy Lee (footballer, born 1962), English footballer for Tranmere Rovers
 Andy Lee (snooker player) (born 1980), Hong Kong snooker player

Musicians
 Andy Lee (South Korean singer) (born 1981), South Korean singer and actor
 Andy Lee (German musician), German rock 'n' roll pianist

Others
 Andy Lee (comedian) (born 1981), Australian comedian
 Andy Lee, a character in the musical 42nd Street

See also
 Andy Newton-Lee, British actor
 Andy Scott-Lee (born 1980), Welsh pop singer